Abdul Bismillah (अब्दुल बिस्मिल्लाह born July 5, 1949) is an Indian novelist writing in Hindi, known for his short stories of life in Muslim rural communities. He is currently a professor in the Department of Hindi, Jamia Millia University. His collection of stories Rough Rough Mail has been translated into French as Raf Raf Express.

References

1949 births
Living people